Dichomeris vigilans is a moth in the family Gelechiidae. It was described by Edward Meyrick in 1914. It is found in Guyana.

The forewings are light ochreous bronzy with a black dot on the base of the costa and an irregular black dot in the disc at one-fourth. The stigmata is black, the discal large and pale edged, with the plical small, beneath the first discal. There is a whitish-ochreous spot on the costa at three-fourths, where a slightly curved indistinct whitish-ochreous line runs to the tornus. There is also a row of black dots around the posterior part of the costa and termen. The hindwings are dark grey.

References

Moths described in 1914
vigilans